Sovetsky District or Sovetsky City District may refer to:
Sovetsky District, Russia, several districts and city districts in Russia
Savyetski District (Sovetsky District), a city district of Minsk, Belarus
Sovietskyi Raion (Sovetsky District), a district of Crimea
Sovetsky City District, Novosibirsk

See also
Sovetsky (disambiguation)

District name disambiguation pages